The Jubilee Centre is a Christian social reform think tank based in the United Kingdom which conducts research into the contemporary relevance of the biblical vision for society.

The Jubilee Centre was founded in 1983 by Michael Schluter to explore the continued relevance for modern societies of the biblical social vision. Characterised by its concern for right relationships - and applied to areas as diverse as debt and the economy, criminal justice, care for the elderly, asylum and immigration, the environment, and sexual ethics - this relational agenda led to the publication in 2005 of the charity's comprehensive 'Jubilee Manifesto: a framework, agenda and strategy for Christian social reform' (see Books by the Jubilee Centre, below). It also produces the quarterly Cambridge Papers, an influential collection of peer-reviewed studies on contemporary issues.

Inspired by the example of Christian reformers such as William Wilberforce, the Jubilee Centre's work led to the launch in 1985 of the now independent Keep Sunday Special campaign, which was instrumental in bringing about Margaret Thatcher's first and only defeat in the Commons. Its work later gave rise to a number of other organisations involved in social reform, including Credit Action, the Relationships Foundation and the international peace-building charity Concordis International. Most recently, it launched the informal Fair Sex Movement which "seeks to promote a greater awareness of the personal, social and economic consequences of sexual relationships". A number of groups are now drawing upon the experience and expertise of the Jubilee Centre to establish similar organisations internationally in countries as diverse as Singapore, Kenya, and the US.

The Jubilee Centre is a British registered charity (No. 288783), financed by private donations.

Books published by the centre
 God, Justice, and Society: Aspects of Law and Legality in the Bible (Burnside, OUP, 2010) 
 Free to Live: Expressing the love of Christ in an age of debt (Brandon, SPCK, 2010) 
 Votewise Now! Helping Christians engage with the issues (Lynas, SPCK, 2009)  
 Just Sex: Is it ever just sex? (Brandon, IVP, 2009)  
 Christianity, Climate Change and Sustainable Living (Spencer & White, SPCK, 2007)  
 Jubilee Manifesto: a framework, agenda and strategy for Christian social reform (Schluter & Ashcroft (eds), IVP, 2005) 
 Votewise: helping Christians engage with the issues (Spencer, SPCK, 2004) 
 Asylum and Immigration: a Christian perspective on a polarised debate (Spencer, Paternoster, 2004) 
 Christian Perspectives on Law and Relationism (Beaumont & Wotherspoon (eds), Paternoster, 2000) 
 Christianity in a Changing World (Michael Schluter and the Cambridge Papers Group, Zondervan, 2000) 
 Relational Justice: Repairing the breach (Burnside & Baker (eds), Waterside Press, 1994) 
 Credit & Debt: Sorting it out (Schluter & Lee, Marshall Pickering, 1989)

See also
List of UK think tanks

References

External links
Official website

Christian charities based in the United Kingdom
Political and economic think tanks based in the United Kingdom
Christianity and politics
Faith and theology think tanks based in the United Kingdom